The Samaritan revolts (c. 484–573) were a series of insurrections in Palaestina Prima province, launched by the Samaritans against the Eastern Roman Empire. The revolts were marked by great violence on both sides, and their brutal suppression at the hands of the Byzantines and their Ghassanid allies severely reduced the Samaritan population. The events irreversibly shifted the demographics of the region, making the Christians the only dominant group in the Palaestina Prima province for many decades onward.

Conflict background 

Following the period of Jewish–Roman wars, the previously dominating Jewish community became almost extinct across Judaea and the shore of Southern Levant, remaining a majority only in Southern Judea, Galilee and Golan. Samaritans and Byzantine Christians filled this vacuum in the central regions of Southern Levant, whereas Nabataeans and Christian Ghassanid Arabs settled the periphery.

This period is considered a golden age for the Samaritan community. The Temple of Gerizim was rebuilt after the Bar Kochba revolt in Judaea, around 135 CE. With the withdrawal of Roman legions, Samaria enjoyed a limited kind of independence during the 3rd and 4th centuries. Baba Rabba (ca. 288–362), the leader of the Samaritans, divided Samaritan territories into districts, and established local rulers out of aristocratic Samaritan families. He also executed a series of reforms and installed state institutions. Much of Samaritan liturgy was set by Baba Rabba during this time. This period of semi-independence was brief, however, as Byzantine forces overran Samaria and took Baba Rabba captive to Constantinople, where he died in prison several years later around 362 CE.

Justa uprising 

During the reign of Eastern Roman Emperor Zeno (r. 474–475 and 476–491), tensions between the Christian community and the Samaritans in Neapolis (Shechem) grew dramatically. According to Samaritan sources, Zeno, whom the sources call "Zait the King of Edom", persecuted the Samaritans with no mercy. The Emperor went to Neapolis, gathered the elders and asked them to convert; when they refused, Zeno had many Samaritans killed, and rebuilt the synagogue into a church. Zeno then took for himself Mount Gerizim, where the Samaritans worshipped God, and built several edifices, among them a tomb for his recently deceased son, on which he put a cross, so that the Samaritans, worshipping God, would prostrate in front of the tomb.

Later, in 484, the Samaritans revolted, provoked by rumors that the Christians intended to transfer the remains of Aaron's sons and grandsons Eleazar, Ithamar and Phinehas. Samaritans reacted by entering the cathedral of Neapolis, killing the Christians inside and severing the fingers of the bishop Terebinthus.

The Samaritans elected Justa (or Justasas) as their king and moved to Caesarea, where a noteworthy Samaritan community lived. There many Christians were killed and the church of St. Procopius was destroyed. Justa celebrated the victory with games in the circus.

According to John Malalas, Asclepiades, the dux Palaestinae (commander of the province's Limes Arabicus troops), whose units were reinforced by the Caesarea-based Arcadiani of lestodioktes (police chief) Rheges, defeated Justa, killed him and sent his head to Zeno. Terebinthus meanwhile fled to Constantinople, requesting an army garrison to prevent further attacks. According to Procopius, Terebinthus went to Zeno to ask for revenge; the Emperor personally went to Samaria to quell the rebellion.

As a result of the revolt, Zeno erected a church dedicated to Mary, mother of Jesus on Mount Gerizim. He also forbade the Samaritans to travel to the mountain to celebrate their religious ceremonies, and confiscated their synagogue there. These actions by the emperor fueled Samaritan anger towards the Christians further.

Some modern historians believe that the order of the facts preserved by Samaritan sources should be inverted, as the persecution of Zeno was a consequence of the rebellion rather than its cause, and should have happened after 484, around 489. Zeno rebuilt the church of Saint Procopius in Neapolis and the Samaritans were banned from Mount Gerizim, on whose top a signaling tower was built to alert in case of civil unrest.

495 Samaritan unrest 

Samaritans rebelled again in 495, during the reign of Emperor Anastasius I Dicorus, reoccupying Mount Gerizim. The Samaritan mob commanded by a Samaritan woman is said to have seized the Church of St. Mary and massacred the garrison. The revolt was subsequently suppressed by the Byzantine governor of Edessa, Procopius, and the Samaritan leaders were slain.

Ben Sabar Revolt (529–531)

Under a charismatic, messianic figure named Julianus ben Sabar (or ben Sahir), the Samaritans launched a war, sometimes referred as the final Samaritan revolt, to create their own independent state in 529. This was perhaps the most violent of all the Samaritan uprisings. According to Procopius, the violence erupted due to restrictions imposed on Samaritans by the Byzantine authorities via Justinian's edicts, while Cyril of Scythopolis indicates sectarian tensions between Christians and Samaritans as the primary cause for the revolt.

Following massive riots in Scythopolis and Samarian countryside, the rebels quickly conquered Neapolis and ben Sabar emerged as their leader, being proclaimed a king. Ben Sabar followed a strict anti-Christian policy: Neapolis' bishop and many priests were murdered and he persecuted the Christians, destroyed churches and organized guerrilla warfare in the countryside, driving the Christians away. According to Byzantine sources, the name of the bishop was Ammonas (also Sammon or Ammon). As a response, forces of the dux Palaestinae, combined with units of local governors and the Ghassanid Arab phylarch, were dispatched to deal with the uprising. Ben Sabar was surrounded and defeated after withdrawing with his forces from Neapolis. After his capture, he was beheaded and his head, crowned with a diadem, was sent to Emperor Justinian.

By 531 the rebellion had been put down. The forces of Emperor Justinian I quelled the revolt with the help of the Ghassanid Arabs; tens of thousands of Samaritans died or were enslaved, with their death-toll possibly being between 20,000 and 100,000. The Christian Byzantine Empire thereafter virtually outlawed the Samaritan faith. According to Procopius of Caesarea, the majority of Samaritan peasants chose to be defiant in this revolt and "were cut to pieces". Further, Samaria, the "world's most fertile land, was left with no one to till it".

556 Samaritan revolt 
The emperor Justinian I faced another major revolt in 556. On this occasion the Jews and the Samaritans seem to have made common cause, beginning their rebellion in Caesarea early in July. They fell upon the Christians in the city, killing many of them, after which they attacked and plundered the churches. The governor, Stephanus, and his military escort were pressed hard, and eventually the governor was killed, while taking refuge in his own house. Amantius, the governor of the East was ordered to quell the revolt, after the widow of Stephanus reached Constantinople.

Despite the Jewish participation, the rebellion seems to have gathered less support than the revolt of Ben Sabar. The Church of the Nativity was burned down, suggesting that the rebellion had spread south to Bethlehem. Either 100,000 or 120,000 are said to have been butchered following the revolt. Others were tortured or driven into exile. However, this is probably an exaggeration as punishment seems to have been limited to the district of Caesarea.

572 revolt 
Still, the tensions were not over yet. Emperor Justin II (r. 565–578) complained about "outrages committed by....Samaritans at the foot of Mount Carmel upon the Christian Churches and the holy images". Probably in response to this event, Justin II issued an order in May 572 rescinding the restoration of rights granted by Justinian. In response, a second joint Samaritan-Jewish revolt took place in summer 572 and again in early 573 or alternatively in 578. John of Ephesus and John of Nikiû may have described this revolt.

Aftermath 
The Samaritan faith was outlawed and from a population of nearly a million, the Samaritan community dwindled to near extinction. The situation of Samaritans further worsened with the failure of the Jewish revolt against Heraclius and the slaughter of the Jewish population in 629.

Samaritan numbers remained very low in the Islamic era, similar to the late Byzantine period – a result of previous revolts and forced conversions. Contemporary sources claim between 30 and 80 thousand Samaritans to have lived in Caesarea Maritima prior to Muslim invasion, compared with roughly 100 thousand Jews, and those minorities out of the total provincial population of 700 thousand, a majority of whom were Christian at the time. By the early Islamic period the Samaritan diaspora disappears from records except small communities of Egypt and Damascus. The Egyptian Samaritan community was likely swelled due to refugees from coastal cities of Palestine as a result of Muslim invasion.

Following the Muslim conquest of the Levant in 636, Samaritans suffered more disabilities than Christians and Jews, as Arab rulers often doubted whether Samaritans are included within the Muslim definition of "People of the Book", though according to Nathan Schur, the Arab Islamic invasion had initially benefited the community. Samaritans still converted to Islam due to economic reasons, social advancement and theological reasons and thus community numbers plunged further. Harsh persecution of Samaritans was however led by the more fanatical Caliphs, such as Al-Mansur (754–775), Harun al-Rashid (786–809) and al-Mutawakkil (847–861). Islamic religious leaders had periodically sought to consolidate their power by stirring anti-Samaritan sentiments and occasionally calling for their annihilation. As a result, Samaritan wealth was practically wiped out.

See also 
 Ghassanids
 Jewish–Roman wars
 List of conflicts in the Near East

External links 
 Tentative listing at UNESCO World Heritage List

References

5th-century rebellions
5th century in the Byzantine Empire
6th-century rebellions
6th century in the Byzantine Empire
Civil wars of the Byzantine Empire
Holy Land during Byzantine rule
Rebellions against the Byzantine Empire
Samaritans
State of Palestine in the Roman era